Kunyang Chhish or Kunyang Chhish is the second-highest mountain in the Hispar Muztagh, a subrange in the Karakoram mountains in Pakistan. An alternate variation of the name is Kunyang Kish.

Location
Kunyang Chhish is located along the northern flank of the Hispar Glacier, one of the major glaciers of the Karakoram. It is the source of the Yazghil glacier that terminates in the heart of Shimshal Valley. It rises northeast of the confluence of the Hispar Glacier and the Kunyang Glacier, while Distaghil Sar 
(the highest peak of the Hispar Muztagh) dominates the Kunyang Glacier on its northern end.

Notable features
Kunyang Chhish is the twenty-first-highest independent mountain in the world. It is a steep, pointed, and complex peak; it easily rivals the slightly higher Distaghil Sar to the North, which has a more rounded profile.

Not counting the two Pumari Chhish summits  to the ENE, the Kunyang Chhish massif has five peaks:
 Kunyang Chhish Main, 
 Kunyang Chhish South, 700 m SSW, with a prominence of only about 
 Kunyang Chhish East , 2 km ESE,  prominence. 
 Kunyang Chhish West, 1.5 km W,  prominence. Also known as Pyramid Peak.
 Kunyang Chhish North, 6 km NNE,  prominence.

Climbing history
The first climbing attempt on Khunyang Chhish was made in 1962 but the climb was aborted after an avalanche on 18 July killed two climbers, Major James Mills and Captain M. R. F. Jones.  Their bodies were never recovered.

The next attempt was in 1965 by a Japanese party mainly consisting of the University of Tokyo members.

The first ascent was accomplished by a Polish team led by Andrzej Zawada in 1971. They climbed a long route up the South Ridge of the peak from the Pumari Chhish Glacier. However, one of their members, Jan Franczuk, was killed in a crevasse accident.

The second, and only other recorded ascent, climbed the Northwest Spur to the North Ridge. Two British climbers, Mark Lowe and Keith Milne, completed this route on July 11, 1988. The route had first been attempted in 1980, and had been attempted again in 1981, 1982 and 1987.

The Himalayan Index lists three recent attempts on this peak, in 2000 and 2003.

After four failed expeditions, starting in 2003, the East summit was first ascended in July 2013 by an Austrian/Swiss team over the South Wall.

See also
 List of mountains in Pakistan
 Gilgit-Baltistan, Pakistan
 Highest mountains of the World
 List of Ultras of the Karakoram and Hindu Kush

References

 Jill Neate, High Asia: An Illustrated History of the 7000 Metre Peaks,  
 Orographical Sketch Map of the Karakoram by Jerzy Wala, 1990. Published by the Swiss Foundation for Alpine Research.
 Andy Fanshawe and Stephen Venables, Himalaya Alpine-Style, Hodder and Stoughton, 1995.
 American Alpine Journal
 Himalayan Index
 DEM files for the Himalaya (Corrected versions of SRTM data)
 
 A list of world peaks ranked by local relief and steepness which includes Khunyang Chhish

External links
 Northern Pakistan - highly detailed placemarks of towns, villages, peaks, glaciers, rivers and minor tributaries in Google Earth
Kunyang Chhish North. A Japanese expedition from Hokkaido University in 1979 was led by Kohei Echizenya climbed the north ridge of Kunyang Chhish (23,321 feet) to make the first ascent. Base Camp was placed on the Kunyang Glacier at 14,300 feet on June 17. They followed the same route as the expedition to Pumari Chhish as far as the north col. Three camps, the highest Camp IV at 22,000 feet, were established on the north ridge. All eight climbers got to the summit on July 11.

Seven-thousanders of the Karakoram
Mountains of Gilgit-Baltistan